Davidson County Airport  is a public use airport in Davidson County, North Carolina, United States. It is owned by the Davidson County Airport Authority and located three nautical miles (6 km) southwest of the central business district of Lexington, North Carolina. It is included in the National Plan of Integrated Airport Systems for 2011–2015, which categorized it as a general aviation facility.

Although most U.S. airports use the same three-letter location identifier for the FAA and IATA, this airport is assigned EXX by the FAA, but has no designation from the IATA.

Facilities and aircraft 
Davidson County Airport covers an area of 330 acres (133 ha) at an elevation of 733 feet (223 m) above mean sea level. It has one runway designated 6/24 with an asphalt surface measuring 5,004 by 100 feet (1,525 x 30 m).

For the 12-month period ending April 30, 2015, the airport had 19,000 aircraft operations, an average of 52 per day: 89% general aviation, 6% air taxi, and 6% military.
At that time there were 75 aircraft based at this airport: 66% single-engine, 20% multi-engine, 8% jet, and 6% helicopter.

The Davidson County Airport offers complete aircraft maintenance from the on field maintenance provider, Superior Aero Services.

Incidents 
On October 23, 2011, a Cozy MK IV aircraft crashed on approach to the airport, resulting in the death of the pilot and an injury to the passenger.

On June 25th, 2018, a Stearman Biplane flipped on landing coming to rest upside down on the runway, resulting in minor injuries to both the pilot and a child passenger.

References

External links 
  at North Carolina DOT airport guide
 Fly High Lexington, the fixed-base operator (FBO)
 Aerial image as of March 1998 from USGS The National Map
 

Airports in North Carolina
Buildings and structures in Davidson County, North Carolina
Transportation in Davidson County, North Carolina